Antonik  Slavic surname according to Slavic naming customs. The name is derived from the root name Antonius.  Notable people with this name include the following:

Arkadius Antonik, of German band Suidakra
Kamil Antonik (born 1998), Polish footballer

See also

Antoni
Antonia (name) 
Antonic
Antonie (given name)
Antonie (surname)
Antonin (name)
Antonio
Antonis 
Antoniu
Antoniuk (name)
Gary Antonick

Notes

Patronymic surnames